is a 2000 Japanese film directed by Shusuke Kaneko.  The film is about a woman with pyrokinetic powers seeks to avenge the murder of her friend.

Cast
 Akiko Yada as Junko Aoki
 Hideaki Itō as Kazuki Tada
 Ryuji Harada as Yasuaki Makihara
 Masami Nagasawa as Kaori Kurata

Production
Pyrokinesis was based on two novels by Miyuki Miyabe: Hatobuki Grass and Crossfire.

Release
Pyrokinesis was released theatrically in Japan on June 10, 2000 where it was distributed by Toho. The film was released directly to home video in the United States by Tokyo Shock on August 26, 2003.

Footnotes

References

External links
 

2000 science fiction films
Films based on Japanese novels
Films directed by Shusuke Kaneko
Japanese science fiction films
2000s Japanese films